Dhanik Lal Mandal (30 March 1932 – 13 November 2022) was an Indian politician from Bihar. He was elected to the Lok Sabha from Jhanjharpur in Bihar, twice in 1977 and 1980. He was the member of Bihar Legislative Assembly (1967–74) and also speaker of Bihar Legislative Assembly, (1967–69).

Mandal remained the Governor of Haryana (7 Feb 1990–13 June 1995). After his election to the 6th Lok Sabha in 1977, he remained Minister of State, Union Ministry of Home Affairs (1977–79) in the Morarji Desai Ministry.

Mandal was born at Belha Village, Madhubani district, and attended Northbrook District School, Darbhanga, Mithila College, Darbhanga, and Allahabad University. He died on 13 November 2022, at the age of 90.

See also
List of Governors of Haryana

References

External links
 Official biographical sketch in Parliament of India website

1932 births
2022 deaths
Governors of Haryana
India MPs 1977–1979
India MPs 1980–1984
Bihar MLAs 1967–1969
Janata Party politicians
Union ministers of state of India
University of Allahabad alumni
Speakers of the Bihar Legislative Assembly
Lok Sabha members from Bihar
People from Darbhanga district
Bihar MLAs 1969–1972
Bihar MLAs 1972–1977
People from Madhubani district
Samyukta Socialist Party politicians
Janata Party (Secular) politicians
Lok Dal politicians